Volodarsk, known officially as Vedmezhe since 2016, is an urban-type settlement in Dovzhansk Raion of Luhansk Oblast in eastern Ukraine. Population:

Demographics
Native language distribution as of the Ukrainian Census of 2001:
 Ukrainian: 33.38%
 Russian: 65.85%
 Others 0.37%

References

Urban-type settlements in Dovzhansk Raion